The 1984 Talladega 500 was a NASCAR Winston Cup Series race held at Talladega Superspeedway on July 29, 1984.

It was the 19th of 30 races for the 1984 Winston Cup Grand National season and was telecast live flag to flag on the CBS television network. Cale Yarborough, the winner of that season's Daytona 500, Winston 500 earlier that season at Talladega, and Van Scoy Diamond 500 at Pocono won the pole at a speed of 202.474 mph. Bill Elliott qualified second.

Background
Talladega Superspeedway, originally known as Alabama International Motor Superspeedway (AIMS), is a motorsports complex located north of Talladega, Alabama. It is located on the former Anniston Air Force Base in the small city of Lincoln. The track is a Tri-oval and was constructed by International Speedway Corporation, a business controlled by the France Family, in the 1960s. Talladega is most known for its steep banking and the unique location of the start/finish line - located just past the exit to pit road. The track currently hosts the NASCAR series such as the Monster Energy Cup Series, Xfinity Series, and the Camping World Truck Series.

Race report
Four NASCAR Cup Series drivers failed to qualify for this race: Delma Cowart, J.D. McDuffie, Blackie Wangerin and Tommy Gale. Rounding out the race's top ten starters were Dale Earnhardt, Terry Labonte, dark horse racer Tommy Ellis, Buddy Baker, Darrell Waltrip, Neil Bonnett, Ron Bouchard, and rookie Rusty Wallace. Richard Petty, who'd won the Firecracker 400 earlier that month, qualified 11th following word that the Smithsonian Institution wanted to put on permanent display the racecar (a 1984 Pontiac Grand Prix stock car under the ownership of Curb Motorsports) with which he'd won Daytona.

Benny Parsons had qualified ninth for the race but crashed hard in practice and was not medically cleared to race, so he was brought up to the CBS Sports broadcast booth alongside Ken Squier and Ned Jarrett for the telecast. Working pit road was veteran MRN Radio broadcaster Mike Joy and National Speed Sport News editor Chris Economaki; Economaki also hosted a short feature (aired during a lengthy caution period) on the nearby Talladega Short Track and its participants' thoughts on someday racing at the superspeedway.

The race became one of the most competitive in racing history, as the lead changed 68 times among 16 drivers. Earnhardt, driving a Chevrolet Monte Carlo for Richard Childress, had taken the lead in Winston Cup points at that point of the season but had not won a race. He took the lead on the opening lap and was soon challenged by Yarborough, Baker, Bobby Allison, Petty, and Labonte. Petty passed Yarborough and Earnhardt on Lap 31 but Earnhardt beat him to the stripe; soon after Elliott Forbes-Robinson crashed and Petty's transmission broke on the subsequent pitstop.

Lap 157 provided the most serious accident of the day when Trevor Boys, racing in the top ten with Ellis, was clipped off Turn Four, spun, and flipped onto his roof at the pit road entrance before tumbling into the tri-oval grass. Boys climbed out of the car uninjured instantly; the only bad thing that happened is that he had to tie his shoe.

Earnhardt intentionally dragged the brake entering turn 1 on the final lap, got a massive run and slingshotted past Terry Labonte on the backstretch to take the win.

Notable crew chiefs in this race were Kenny Wallace, Junie Donlavey, Darrell Bryant, Joey Arrington, Cecil Gordon, Dale Inman, Travis Carter, Waddell Wilson, Tim Brewer, Bud Moore, Jeff Hammond, Jake Elder, Harry Hyde and Kirk Shelmerdine.

Qualifying

Finish
The finish shook into an eleven-car battle; Bouchard ran out of gas with three laps to go and Labonte held the lead; his crew chief Dale Inman radioed Labonte to get out of the lead with two to go fearing a last-lap pass, but by this point Harry Gant had raced into contention and was battling Earnhardt and Baker for second.

Earnhardt broke away to a ten-length win with Baker edging Labonte for second and Allison edging Yarborough for fourth. It was the second year in a row that he won the race and he won both races with last lap passes. He became the first driver to win back to back Talladega 500s (he also completed the feat in 1990-1991 and he won back to back Winston 500's in 1999-2000). The prior year he won in a Ford driving for Bud Moore. This was his first win with Richard Childress driving a Chevrolet.

Earnhardt led thirteen times for 40 laps. Six of the ten positions behind Earnhardt were decided by photo finishes at the line. Also, Earnhardt started the race in third, led the first lap and the last.

Individual paychecks for each driver ranged from the winner's share of $47,100 ($ when adjusted for inflation) to the last-place finisher's share of $1,800 ($ when adjusted for inflation) from a total purse of $352,500. ($ when adjusted for inflation).

Ken Ragan received his only lead lap finish of his career at this race.

Top 20 finishers

Standings after the race

References

Talladega 500
Talladega 500
NASCAR races at Talladega Superspeedway